Stylobasium is a genus of xerophytic shrubs in the family Surianaceae. The genus is endemic to Australia, with species occurring in Western Australia, Northern Territory, and Queensland.
 
Species include:

Stylobasium australe (Hook.) Prance
Stylobasium spathulatum Desf. - Pebble bush

References

Fabales genera
Surianaceae
Fabales of Australia
Taxa named by René Louiche Desfontaines